Adolfas Ramanauskas (March 6, 1918 – November 29, 1957), code name Vanagas ("The Hawk"), was a prominent Lithuanian partisan and one of the leaders of the Lithuanian resistance. Ramanauskas was working as a teacher under the Nazi administration when Lithuania was re-occupied by the Soviet Union in 1944–45. He joined the anti-Soviet resistance after being pressured by the NKVD to spy on his students, eventually advancing from a platoon commander to the chairman of the Union of Lithuanian Freedom Fighters. Betrayed by a classmate, he was arrested, brutally tortured, and eventually executed. He was the last known partisan commander to be captured.

Biography

Early life
Ramanauskas was born to a Lithuanian immigrant family in New Britain, Connecticut, United States. In 1921, his family returned to Lithuania, bought  of land in Bielėnai near Rudamina, and took up farming. Ramanauskas graduated from Galiniai primary school in 1930, and from Lazdijai secondary school in 1937. He continued his studies at the Klaipėda Pedagogical Institute (now Vilnius Pedagogical University). Just before graduation the Klaipėda Region (Memel Territory) was ceded to Nazi Germany, and the institute was consequently evacuated to Panevėžys. The same year, Ramanauskas enrolled into the Kaunas War School. He graduated with the rank of second lieutenant in the reserve forces. His class of 1940 was the last graduating class before the Soviet Union occupied Lithuania in June 1940.

After graduation, Ramanauskas moved to Krivonys near Druskininkai where he became a teacher. He participated in the anti-Soviet June Uprising at the start of the 1941 German invasion of Russia. During the Nazi occupation of Lithuania, Ramanauskas lived in Alytus and taught mathematics, the Lithuanian language, and physical education at the Alytus Teachers' Seminary.

The Red Army's eventual victory over the Wehrmacht led to the re-occupation of Lithuania. In early 1945, Ramanauskas joined the Lithuanian partisans who waged guerrilla warfare against the Soviet occupants. He adopted the nom-de-guerre Vanagas ("Hawk") and joined partisan formations in southern Lithuania (Suvalkija and Dzūkija), which were most active among Lithuanian partisans.

Guerrilla warfare
Ramanauskas joined a partisan platoon operating in the environs of Nemunaitis and Alovė and was immediately elected its commander. He organized disorganized resistance members into a 140-men Merkinė company (later reorganized into a battalion). The early stages of resistance saw open battles with the NKVD and destruction battalion forces. Two of such encounters were in the Varčios Forest between Alovė and Daugai on June 14 and 23, 1945. During the shootout, 30–47 partisans were killed and 6–14 taken prisoners. On July 1, 1945, Ramanauskas was promoted to commander of Merkys Brigade (composed of three battalions – Merkinė, Marcinkonys and Druskininkai). In October 1945, in Nedzingė he married Birutė Mažeikaitė, a former student at the Alytus Teachers' Seminary and fellow partisan fighter (codename Vanda). On December 15, 1945, he led a daring but unsuccessful attack on Merkinė. The partisans destroyed Soviet records, but they could not free prisoners or overpower the Soviet troops in the local church. Ramanauskas strove to improve organization and centralized command of the partisans. He became commander of the Dainava Command (Lithuanian: Dainavos apygarda) after the death of Dominykas Jėčys-Ąžuolis in September 1947 and of the South Lithuania Region (Lithuanian: Pietų Lietuvos sritis) in 1948. He also wrote, edited, and published numerous partisan newspapers, including Mylėk Tėvynę (Love Your Fatherland, 1946–47), Laisvės varpas (The Bell of Freedom, 1947–49), Свободное слово (The Free Word, 1947–49), a Russian-language newspaper for Soviet soldiers, and Miško brolis (The Forest Brother, 1951–52).

In February 1949, he participated in a meeting of all partisan commanders in the village of Minaičiai. The Union of Lithuanian Freedom Fighters, chief command of the partisans, was established during the meeting. Ramanauskas was elected to the presidium of the Union and as the first deputy of its chairman Jonas Žemaitis. He was also promoted to the rank of Major. Ramanauskas was one of the signatories of the Lithuanian Partisans Declaration of February 16, 1949, which proclaimed Lithuania as a democratic republic and the Lithuanian nation as a sovereign power.

In fall 1949, Ramanauskas was further promoted to Colonel and chief commander of the defensive forces of the Union of Lithuanian Freedom Fighters. When Žemaitis resigned due to poor health in 1952, Ramanauskas became the leader of the Union. However, by that time the armed resistance had diminished. Due to heavy losses organized structures broke down and partisans continued their struggles individually. Ramanauskas officially ordered cessation of armed struggle in favour of passive resistance.

He obtained fake documents and lived in hiding. While in hiding he wrote three-part memoirs, which were hidden by trusted people and uncovered only in 1988–89 during the era of glasnost and first published as Daugel krito sūnų… (Many Sons Have Fallen...) in 1991. Ramanauskas was betrayed by Antanas Urbonas, a former classmate at Kaunas, and arrested on October 11, 1956.

He was taken to the KGB prison in Vilnius (now the Museum of Genocide Victims) and tortured. On October 12, barely alive, he was transferred to a hospital, where doctors noted his many wounds – his eye was punctured 5 times, he was missing genitals, had a bruised stomach, etc. Sentenced to death on September 25, 1957, he was executed on November 29, 1957.

His wife Birutė Mažeikaitė was sentenced to 8 years in the Gulag system.

Alleged collaboration with Nazi Germany

Ramanauskas has been accused of supporting the Lithuanian Activist Front and commanding a paramilitary group that persecuted the Jewish community of Druskininkai in 1941. In his memoirs, Ramanauskas recalled leading a partisan unit in Nazi-occupied Druskininkai. Multiple residents of Druskininkai claimed to have witnessed partisans beating and killing jews and suspected communists. Contemporary police documents indicate that armed partisan groups in Druskininkai executed at least 28 people.

The Lithuanian Ministry of Foreign Affairs and state-funded Genocide and Resistance Research Centre maintain that the allegations are "lies [...] spread first by the Soviet-era KGB secret police to discredit him." Historian and politician Arvydas Anušauskas has similarly claimed that the allegations have their origins in a "Russian backed anti-Lithuanian disinformation campaign" led by the KGB officer and his torturer Nachman Dushanski.

Awards

Antemortem 
On 9 April 1946, Ramanauskas-Vanagas was awarded the Zeal Stripe (Uolumo juostelė) for conducting organizational work for the resistance movement and the Bravery Stripe (juostelė "Už narsumą") for heading the attack on Soviet occupants in Merkinė. In 1949–1950, he received the Freedom Fight Cross with Swords (1st and 2nd class).

Postmortem 
On 27 December 1997, Ramanauskas-Vanagas, was granted the status of a "military volunteer," and on 26 January 1998, he was posthumously granted the rank of reserve brigadier general by decree of the President of Lithuania, in addition to being awarded the Order of the Cross of Vytis (second class) and in 1999 the Order of the Cross of Vytis (first class). In 2018, Seimas passed a resolution identifying Ramanauskas as the "highest-ranking Lithuanian official in the fight against Soviet occupation" from 1954 to 1957.

Legacy

A book of memoirs by Ramanauskas, written between 1952 and 1956 and assembled by his daughter Auksutė Ramanauskaitė-Skokauskienė, was published in 1991 under the title Daugel krito sūnų ("Many sons fell"). In 2018, the Lithuanian Genocide and Resistance Research Centre published an English translation of the work, entitled Many Sons Have Fallen in the Partisan Ranks. Auksutė was also elected to the Seimas in 2008.

In December 2017, Israeli ambassador Amir Maimon visited Ramanauskas's daughter and reportedly "expressed indirect diplomatic support to the memory of the freedom fighter."

Monument in the U.S. 
In 2017, plans to erect a monument for the 100th anniversary of Ramanauskas's birth in his native New Britain, Connecticut were cancelled following the adoption of a council petition. On May 4, 2019, a monument to Ramanauskas was unveiled in Chicago, a decision which was criticized by several organisations, including the Simon Wiesenthal Center, the World Jewish Congress, and the Jewish Agency. The , however, issued a statement that "at the present time [they have] no reliable information implicating Lithuanian partisan leader Adolfas Ramanauskas in Holocaust crimes."

Grave 
In 2018, Ramanauskas's grave was found at the Našlaičiai ( Orphans) Cemetery in Antakalnis, Vilnius. The identity was confirmed by anthropological analysis of the skull, DNA investigation, and photographic matching. His death was the result of a gunshot in the vertex of his head. His remains were discovered and reburied in a state funeral among other state leaders in the Antakalnis Cemetery, at which Lithuanian President Dalia Grybauskaitė spoke, diplomats from 30 countries and thousands of ordinary people participated. The Seimas designated 2018 the year of Ramanauskas-Vanagas.

Further reading
 
 
 
 
  Obituary of Adolfas Ramanauskas-Vanagas. The State Funeral Ceremony on 5 and 6 October 2018 in Vilnius

References

1918 births
1957 deaths
20th-century executions of Lithuanian people
Lithuanian resistance members
American people of Lithuanian descent
Executed people from Connecticut
Lithuanian generals
Lithuanian partisans
Lithuanian people executed by the Soviet Union
Lithuanian people of World War II
Lithuanian torture victims
People from Alytus County
People from New Britain, Connecticut
Recipients of the Order of the Cross of Vytis
Soviet dissidents
Lithuanian University of Educational Sciences alumni
Burials at Antakalnis Cemetery